Tokyo – New York by the band Vodka Collins is an LP on the Toshiba EMI label, recorded 19 March to 3 September 1973, and released 5 November 1973. The album yielded singles "Sands of Time", "Automatic Pilot", and, later, "Billy Mars". 
It was produced by Masatoshi Hashiba, who also produced records of the Sadistic Mika Band at around the same time. Tokyo – New York has been re-issued several times, most recently in 2011 (TOCT-11405).

Track listing
A1	Automatic Pilot
A2	Billy Mars
A3	Terminal City
A4	Sands Of Time
A5	Pontiac Pan
B1	Diamond To Dungarees
B2	Monitor
B3	Vacuum Girl
B4	Scratchin'

Vodka Collins albums
1973 albums
Man's Ruin Records albums